Tros or TROS may refer to:

 18281 Tros, an asteroid
 Transformer read-only storage, a type of read-only memory
 TROS, a Dutch broadcasting union, originally an acronym for Televisie Radio Omroep Stichting
 Tros (mythology), a figure in Greek mythology who was the eponymous ancestor of the Trojans
 Tros, Poland, a village
 Tros of Samothrace, fictional Greek freedom fighter in the works of Talbot Mundy
 TRoS or The Riddle of Steel, a roleplaying game
 Star Wars: The Rise of Skywalker, a 2019 film

See also
 TRO (disambiguation)